Rhyacophila is a genus of caddisflies in the family Rhyacophilidae. There are at least 640 described species in Rhyacophila.

ITIS Taxonomic note:
Type species: Rhyacophila vulgaris F.J. Pictet (selected by HH Ross, 1944, Bull Illinois Nat Hist Surv 23: 32).

See also
 List of Rhyacophila species

References

Further reading

 
 
 

Trichoptera genera
Taxonomy articles created by Polbot
Spicipalpia
Taxa named by François Jules Pictet de la Rive